David Mehić (born 24 September 1997) is a Serbian professional volleyball player. At the professional club level, he plays for Vojvodina Novi Sad.

Sporting achievements

Clubs
 National championships
 2014/2015  Serbian Cup, with OK Vojvodina
 2015/2016  Serbian SuperCup, with OK Vojvodina
 2016/2017  Serbian Championship, with OK Vojvodina
 2017/2018  Serbian Championship, with OK Vojvodina
 2018/2019  Serbian Championship, with OK Vojvodina
 2019/2020  Serbian Cup, with OK Vojvodina
 2021/2022  Serbian SuperCup, with OK Vojvodina
 2021/2022  Serbian Championship, with OK Vojvodina

References

External links
 
 Player profile at Volleybox.net

1997 births
Living people
Sportspeople from Novi Sad
Serbian men's volleyball players
Serbian expatriate sportspeople in France
Expatriate volleyball players in France
Serbian expatriate sportspeople in Poland
Expatriate volleyball players in Poland
LKPS Lublin players
Outside hitters